Adam Archibald VC (14 January 1879 – 10 March 1957) was a Scottish First World War recipient of the Victoria Cross, the highest and most prestigious award for gallantry in the face of the enemy that can be awarded to British and Commonwealth forces.

In 1915, Archibald enlisted with the 7th Durham Light Infantry before transferring to the 218th Field Company, Royal Engineers during the second battle of the Sambre. At the age of 39, he was awarded the Victoria Cross for action while his unit was attempting to bridge the Sambre–Oise Canal. Archibald received his medal from King George V at Buckingham Palace in May 1919. From his citation:

Freemasonry
He was initiated into Freemasonry in Lodge Elgin & Bruce, No.1077], (Limekilns, Fife, Scotland) in 1912. He later affiliated to Lodge St James Operative, No.97, (Edinburgh, Scotland).

The Medal
His Victoria Cross is displayed at the Royal Engineers Museum, Chatham, Kent.

Death
Adam Archibald died at his home in Leith at the age of 78. He was cremated at Warriston Crematorium.

References

Further reading

Monuments to Courage (David Harvey, 1999)
The Register of the Victoria Cross (This England, 1997)
The Sapper VCs (Gerald Napier, 1998)
Scotland's Forgotten Valour (Graham Ross, 1995)
VCs of the First World War - The Final Days 1918 (Gerald Gliddon, 2000)

External links
Scotland's War
Burial location of Adam Archibald "Edinburgh"
Location of Adam Archibald's Victoria Cross "Royal Engineers Museum, Gillingham"

British World War I recipients of the Victoria Cross
Durham Light Infantry soldiers
Royal Engineers soldiers
British Army personnel of World War I
1879 births
1957 deaths
People from Leith
British Army personnel of the Russian Civil War
British Army recipients of the Victoria Cross
Military personnel from Edinburgh